Joachim "Jochen" Eigenherr (born 18 February 1947) is a German former sprinter. He competed in the men's 200 metres at the 1968 Summer Olympics representing West Germany.

References

External links
 

1947 births
Living people
Athletes (track and field) at the 1968 Summer Olympics
German male sprinters
Olympic athletes of West Germany
People from Uelzen (district)
Sportspeople from Lower Saxony